Candice Mia Daly (January 4, 1966 – December 14, 2004) was an American film and television actress. In the late 1980s and early 1990s she starred in a number of B-movies and cult films such as After Death (1988) and Liquid Dreams (1991).  She was at one time engaged to one of her co-stars Brent Huff.  Perhaps the role which garnered her the widest audience was psychotic Veronica Landers on American soap opera The Young and the Restless from 1997 to 1998.

Work was scarce for Daly after she left The Young and the Restless, and she was found dead in a rundown Los Angeles apartment on December 14, 2004. The cause of death was listed as polydrug intoxication complicated by severe steatohepatitis; although her boyfriend stated that he believes that she was a victim of foul play.

Filmography

References

External links
 

1966 births
2004 deaths
American film actresses
American soap opera actresses
American television actresses
Actresses from Los Angeles
20th-century American actresses
21st-century American women